Mitar Ergelaš (born 5 August 2002) is a Serbian footballer who currently plays as a midfielder for Čukarički.

Career statistics

Club

Notes

References

2002 births
Living people
Serbian footballers
Serbia youth international footballers
Association football midfielders
Serbian SuperLiga players
FK Vojvodina players
FK Čukarički players
People from Ruma